The 2020 Hawaii House of Representatives elections took place on November 3, 2020, as part of the biennial 2020 United States elections. The process will elect all 51 seats in the Hawaii House of Representatives. Primary elections took place on August 8.

Predictions

Summary of results

Closest races 
Seats where the margin of victory was under 10%:

Retiring incumbents
Six incumbent representatives (5 Democrats and one Republican) did not seek reelection in 2020.

District 4: Joy San Buenaventura (D) to run for State Senate
District 5: Richard Creagan (D)
District 20: Calvin Say (D) to run for Honolulu City Council
District 41: Rida Cabanilla (D) to run for State Senate
District 50: Cynthia Thielen (R)
District 51: Chris Lee (D) to run for State Senate

Defeated incumbents

In primary
Two incumbent representatives, both Democrats sought reelection but was defeated in the August 8 primary.

District 22: Tom Brower (D)
District 30: Romeo Munoz Cachola (D)

Detailed results

Source for primary results:
Source for general election results:

District 1

District 2

District 3

District 4
Democratic primary

General election

District 5
Democratic primary

General election

District 6
Incumbent Democrat Nicole Lowen was automatically reelected without opposition, with no votes recorded.

District 7
Incumbent Democrat David Tarnas was automatically reelected without opposition, with no votes recorded.

District 8
Democratic primary

General election
Incumbent Democrat Troy Hashimoto was automatically reelected without opposition, with no votes recorded.

District 9

District 10
Democratic primary

General election

District 11
Democratic primary

General election

District 12
Democratic primary

General election
Incumbent Democrat Kyle Yamashita was automatically reelected without opposition, with no votes recorded.

District 13
Democratic primary

General election

District 14

District 15

District 16

District 17

District 18
Democratic primary

General election

District 19

District 20
Democratic primary

General election

District 21
Incumbent Democrat Scott Nishimoto was automatically reelected without opposition, with no votes recorded.

District 22
Democratic primary

General election

District 23
Incumbent Democrat Dale Kobayashi was automatically reelected without opposition, with no votes recorded.

District 24

District 25
Incumbent Democrat Sylvia Luke was automatically reelected without opposition, with no votes recorded.

District 26
Democratic primary

General election
Incumbent Democrat Scott Saiki was automatically reelected without opposition, with no votes recorded.

District 27
Incumbent Democrat Takashi Ohno was automatically reelected without opposition, with no votes recorded.

District 28
Incumbent Democrat John Mizuno was automatically reelected without opposition, with no votes recorded.

District 29
Democratic primary

General election
Incumbent Democrat Daniel Holt was automatically reelected without opposition, with no votes recorded.

District 30
Democratic primary

Republican primary

General election

District 31
Incumbent Democrat Aaron Ling Johanson was automatically reelected without opposition, with no votes recorded.

District 32
Incumbent Democrat Linda Ichiyama was automatically reelected without opposition, with no votes recorded.

District 33
Democratic primary

General election

District 34

District 35

District 36
Democratic primary

General election

District 37

District 38
Incumbent Democrat Henry Aquino was automatically reelected without opposition, with no votes recorded.

District 39

District 40

District 41
Democratic primary

General election

District 42
Democratic primary

General election
Incumbent Democrat Sharon Har was automatically reelected without opposition, with no votes recorded.

District 43
Democratic primary

General election

District 44
Democratic primary

General election

District 45

District 46
Democratic primary

General election
Incumbent Democrat Amy Perruso was automatically reelected without opposition, with no votes recorded.

District 47

District 48
Democratic primary

General election
Incumbent Democrat Lisa Kitagawa was automatically reelected without opposition, with no votes recorded.

District 49

District 50
Democratic primary

General election

District 51
Democratic primary

Republican primary

General election

See also
 2020 Hawaii elections

References

External links
 
 
  (State affiliate of the U.S. League of Women Voters)
 
 Hawaii Office of Elections Candidate List

House of Representatives
Hawaii House of Representatives elections
Hawaii House